Dhrovjan (Droviani) is a community in the Vlorë County, southern Albania. At the 2015 local government reform it became part of the municipality Finiq. An ethnic Greek village, in 1967 it contained around 300 houses, divided into two Mahalle. Ancient Greek coins have been excavated in the fields of Dhrovjan, which have provided evidence that there were once several ancient Greek temples in the area. Dhrovjan is the burial place of Harold 'Bill' Sykes, a British bi-plane pilot shot down in November 1940.

Dhrovjan is inhabited solely by Greeks.

Notable people
Tasos Vidouris
Konstantinos Stephanopoulos

References

External links
 Site of the Union of Drovianites (in Greek)
 Bi-plane Fighter Aces

Epirus
Greek communities in Albania
Populated places in Finiq
Villages in Vlorë County